Preludes: Rare and Unreleased Recordings is a two-CD compilation of music and interviews, including unreleased outtakes and demos, by singer-songwriter Warren Zevon, who died in 2003.

A few months after Zevon's death, his son, Jordan, drove out to one of his father's storage spaces in the San Fernando Valley to begin the process of sorting through old recordings. He discovered over one hundred unreleased outtakes and demos in a piano-sized touring case.

Preludes features sixteen of the newly discovered recordings, including six tracks never before released on any Warren Zevon album: "Empty Hearted Town", "Going All the Way", "Steady Rain", "Stop Rainin' Lord", "Studebaker" and "The Rosarita Beach Café".  All of the songs were recorded before 1976. The album also includes previously unreleased versions of "Werewolves of London" and "Accidentally Like a Martyr". The second disc includes a radio interview with Zevon, conducted by Jody Denberg in 2000.

The album was released by New West Records in 2007 in a deluxe two-CD package in a hardbound slipcase. It includes a 44-page booklet with previously unpublished family photos, integrated with excerpts from the memoir I'll Sleep When I'm Dead: The Dirty Life and Times of Warren Zevon by Crystal Zevon.

Track listing
All songs by Warren Zevon unless otherwise noted.

Disc one
"Empty Hearted Town" – 3:04
"Steady Rain" – 4:18
"Join Me in L.A." – 2:27
"Hasten Down the Wind" – 2:30
"Werewolves of London" (LeRoy Marinell, Waddy Wachtel, Zevon) – 3:36
"Tule's Blues" – 3:02
"The French Inhaler" – 3:31
"Going All the Way" – 2:15
"Poor Poor Pitiful Me" – 3:09
"Studebaker" – 2:34
"Accidentally Like a Martyr" – 3:05
"Carmelita" – 3:56
"I Used to Ride So High" – 2:43
"Stop Rainin' Lord" – 2:11
"The Rosarita Beach Café" – 4:08
"Desperados Under the Eaves" – 3:44
Special edition bonus tracks
 "Workin' Man's Pay" – 2:04
 "Frozen Notes" – 1:42
 "Some Kind of Rider" – 3:21

Disc two
"I Was in the House When the House Burned Down" – 3:02
"Discourse – Warren waxes and wanes on songwriting, Los Angeles, modern classical music, the early days of his career and playing the guitar versus the piano" – 7:14
"Discourse – Musings on mortality, song noir, religion in his music and the King of Rock n' Roll" – 5:07
"Discourse – A chat about the producers of Life'll Kill Ya, the album's stark sound and other singers covering his songs" – 5:09
"Back in the High Life Again" (Will Jennings, Steve Winwood) – 3:11
"Discourse – His take on Steve Winwood's classic, the split personality, images and inspirations in his compositions" – 3:58
"Discourse – His feelings about the Rhino Records 2 CD Anthology of his work, the size of his audience, having his music used on TV shows and movies, acting, performing and the response to "Don't Let Us Get Sick"" – 5:14
"Don't Let Us Get Sick" (solo acoustic) – 3:10
"I Was in the House When the House Burned Down" and "Back in the High Life Again" are taken from Life'll Kill Ya (2000). 
"Don't Let Us Get Sick" was recorded live December 3, 1999, at Austin City Limits Studios for 107.1 KGSR Radio Austin 9th Anniversary Concert; previously unreleased.

Production
Credits are adapted from the album liner notes.
Peter Jesperson – compilation producer
Jordan Zevon – executive producer, family photos 
Cameron Strang – executive producer 
Danny Goldberg – executive producer
Gavin Lurssen – mastering at Lurssen Mastering, Hollywood, California
Crystal Zevon – family photos
Susie Delaney – still life photography 
Kat Delaney – art direction, design
Ken Anderson – legal
Disc two
Jody Denberg – producer, interviewer
Diane Gentile – project coordinator
Marty Quinn – engineer at Quad Recording Studios, New York City
Jerry Taub – mastering at Terra Nova Digital Audio, Austin, Texas 
Bill Johnson – mastering at Terra Nova Digital Audio; engineer on "Don't Let Us Get Sick"
Paul Q. Kolderie – producer, engineer on "I Was in the House When the House Burned Down" and "Back in the High Life Again" 
Sean Slade – producer, engineer on "I Was in the House When the House Burned Down" and "Back in the High Life Again"

References

Warren Zevon compilation albums
Compilation albums published posthumously
2007 compilation albums
Interview albums
2007 live albums
Demo albums
New West Records compilation albums
New West Records live albums